A travelling salesman is a travelling door-to-door seller of goods, also known as a peddler.

Travelling salesman may also refer to:

 Travelling salesman problem, in discrete or combinatorial optimization
 The Traveling Salesman, a 1908 play by James Forbes
 The Traveling Salesman (1916 film), a silent film based on the play by Forbes
 The Traveling Salesman (1921 film), a silent film based on the play by Forbes
 Travelling Salesman (2012 film), a intellectual thriller
 "Traveling Salesmen", the twelfth episode of the third season of the US version of The Office

See also
 Death of a Salesman, a 1949 play by Arthur Miller about a traveling salesman

pt: Caixeiro-viajante